The Royal Commission on Government Organization (also known as the Glassco Commission) was a Canadian Royal Commission appointed in 1960 to inquire into the organization of the Government of Canada.  Chaired by businessman J. Grant Glassco, it issued a five volume report in 1962 and 1963 recommending that government departments be managed on a decentralized basis, that the Treasury Board be reorganized, and that senior management should rotate between departments.

References

1960s in Canada
Royal commissions in Canada
Government in Canada
Organization design
Reform in Canada